Emily Alexander may refer to:

 Emily Alexander (Honorverse), a character in Honorverse
 Emily Alexander (Hollyoaks), a character in Hollyoaks